Shimla Assembly constituency, also spelt Simla in olden days, is one of the 68 assembly constituencies of Himachal Pradesh, a northern Indian state. It is a segment of the Shimla Lok Sabha constituency.

Members of Legislative Assembly
 1962 (Punjab Assembly): Gyan Chand (Congress), as part of Punjab State.
 Shimla was merged with Himachal Pradesh in 1966.

Election candidates

2022

Election results

2017

See also
 List of constituencies of the Himachal Pradesh Legislative Assembly
 Shimla
 Shimla district

References

External links
 

Shimla district
Assembly constituencies of Himachal Pradesh